Doug McKillip (born December 20, 1969) is an American attorney and politician from Georgia. McKillip is a former Democratic member and current Republican member of the Georgia House of Representatives from the 115th district from 2007 to 2013.

Early life 
On December 20, 1969, McKillip was born in Athens, Georgia.

Education 
In 1991, McKillip earned a Bachelor of Science degree in Political Science from University of Georgia. In 1994, McKillip earned a JD degree from University of Georgia School of Law.

Career 
McKillip is an attorney.

On November 7, 2006, McKillip won the election and became a Democratic member of Georgia House of Representatives for District 115. McKillip defeated E.H. Culpepper and Regina Quick with 52.14% of the votes. On November 4, 2008, as an incumbent, McKillip won the election unopposed and continued serving District 115. On November 2, 2010, as an incumbent and a Democratic, McKillip won the election unopposed and continued serving District 115. 

In December 2010, McKillip changed his political party from a Democrat to a Republican.

Personal life 
McKillip's wife is Mary McKillip. They have three children. McKillip and his family live in Athens, Georgia.

References

External links 
 Doug McKillip at ballotpedia.org

1969 births
Georgia (U.S. state) Democrats
Georgia (U.S. state) Republicans
Living people
Members of the Georgia House of Representatives
Politicians from Athens, Georgia